Allium hypsistum is a Nepalese species of wild onion in the Amaryllis family.

Allium hypsistum is one of two species referred to as jimbu in Nepal, used in Nepalese cuisine. The other is Allium przewalskianum.

References

Nepalese cuisine
Endemic flora of Nepal
hypsistum
Plants described in 1960